Kabaddi at the 2010 Asian Games was held in Nansha Gymnasium, Guangzhou, China from November 22 to 26, 2010.

Schedule

Medalists

Medal table

Draw

Men
The teams were seeded based on their final ranking at the 2006 Asian Games.

Group A
 (1)
 (4)

Group B
 (2)
 (3)

Women
The teams were seeded based on their final ranking at the 2008 Asian Championship.

Group A

Group B

Final standing

Men

Women

References

Men's results
Women's results

External links
Official website

 
2010 Asian Games events
2010
Asian